Busways Travel Services was a bus company, which operated local and regional bus services in Tyne and Wear, England. The company was purchased by the Stagecoach Group in July 1994.

History
In October 1986, to comply with the Transport Act 1985, the assets of the Tyne and Wear Passenger Transport Executive were transferred to a new legal entity, known as Busways Travel Services.

In May 1989, the company was sold to its employees in an employee share ownership plan – with management owning 51% of shares and employees owning 49%. During this time, the fleet carried the strap line "An employee owned company".

In 1993, the company's management considered an offer from the employee board members to buy out some of the management shares using one of the employee share trusts. Given the fast-paced development of the industry at the time, this was not thought to be in the company's long-term interest.

By March 1994, the company was considering options of geographic expansion, merger, acquisition or sale to a national group. The company had become concerned at its proximity to the recently floated Go-Ahead Group, and the fact that United Automobile Services to the south, and Northumbria to the north, were also possible targets for the larger groups. It believed that independently it would struggle to defend the company against expansion by these neighbours in the future.

The Busways board came to the conclusion that a merger with one of the larger groups was the only viable option.

Stagecoach ownership

Stagecoach acquired Busways in July 1994. This takeover had to be accepted by around 1,700 employee shareholders, 99% of which accepted. Stagecoach was the preferred and recommended bidder out of two national groups.

Busways was relatively unique amongst new Stagecoach subsidiaries in that it kept its identity for a few years, before the corporate livery was rolled out. During this period fleet names carried the new strap line 'Part of the Stagecoach Group'. On eventual adoption of the striped scheme, the Busways, Blue Bus Service and Economic names survived in the red Stagecoach strap lines. Busways was eventually dropped with the emergence of the second generation Stagecoach livery.

Darlington controversy
In January 1994, employee owned Busways had been considering expanding in the Darlington area, although by March this study was suspended while other possible futures were being considered. In the months following the Stagecoach takeover, the Busways subsidiary was a key player in the Darlington Bus War.

Stagecoach North East
The Busways Travel Services name still exists as the legal entity behind Stagecoach North East. Buses are liveried as Stagecoach in Newcastle/Sunderland/South Shields. The Busways travel shops in Newcastle have since been closed. Byker Bus depot has been demolished and replaced by a brand new facility at Walkergate.

Fleet history
Busways inherited a large fleet of panoramic windowed Leyland Atlanteans and Daimler Fleetlines from the PTE, although these had been substantially renewed in 1986 with 65 Alexander RH bodied Leyland Olympians. Busways also inherited several Bristol LH single-deckers from the PTE, many of which were scrapped or converted to driver trainers. Some examples survived into 1994, used in the main fleet, Blue Bus Services and Favourite Services, and the type was added to in this time with many second hand examples. In PTE ownership the company acquired several 1987 Mercedes-Benz 709D minibuses, and 1989 Leyland Lynxes.

In 1989 and 1991, employee owned Busways standardised on the Scania N113 chassis, on Northern Counties and Alexander RH double-deck bodies, and Alexander PS single-deck bodies. The double deck fleet was also added to with the purchase of Northern Counties-bodied 1987 Leyland Olympians from London Transport's Bexleybus operation. In November 1992, Busways moved into the midibus market, purchasing 20 Alexander Dash bodied Dennis Darts during a period of direct competition with Welcome Passenger Services, although 1993 batches were augmented with Plaxton bodied examples.

Dart purchases continued into the Stagecoach ownership. In 1994 some second hand Bristol REs were acquired for the Blue Bus Services and Economic fleets, all of which were withdrawn by 1998. The double-deck fleet was again augmented with 40 Alexander RL bodied Volvo Olympians in late 1995/early 1996.

Identities

Busways
The majority of bus services were under the Busways fleet name, with an appropriate pre-name: Newcastle (Slatyford), City (Byker), South Shields and Sunderland. The livery adopted was based on the old PTE scheme of cadmium yellow (as previously used by Newcastle Corporation) and white, but with a coloured skirt, midline band, wheelhubs and fleetname according to division: maroon for City and Newcastle, blue for South Shields and green for Sunderland - colours previously associated with the former Corporation Transport liveries - or black for ancillary vehicles. Minibuses wore a similar scheme, but with a black skirt, thin black, green, maroon and blue stripes, and black "Mini Busways" fleetnames in order that they could be quickly transferred between divisions.

Blue Bus Services
This division, which shared the Newcastle Busways depot at Slatyford, was originally for the former PTE bus services which ran from Newcastle northwards into Northumberland, most notably the Ponteland and Darras Hall routes. It later expanded into PTE contract work, using older buses from the main Busways fleet. It was launched in advance of deregulation, in July 1986, and the name was a throw-back to the "Blue Bus Services" of Newcastle Corporation Transport many years before the PTE came along. Blue Bus Services vehicles, which were all dual purpose vehicles at the start, wore a dark blue and cream livery, with either dark blue fleetnames applied to the cream area or yellow fleetnames applied to the dark blue area, while some buses transferred from Economic, Armstrong Galley Buses or even the main fleet were not repainted and just gained new fleetnames.

Favourite
The Favourite operation was introduced in certain parts of County Durham to compete with Trimdon Motor Services, whose subsidiary Tyne & Wear Omnibus Company had set up in Newcastle (and later Sunderland) in direct competition with Busways. It later expanded into contract work, including one of the town routes in Sunderland. Favourite buses wore a livery of white upper, dark orange midline and a brown skirt, with brown fleet names - essentially Greater Manchester PTE colours, as that was where much of the original fleet had originated.

Economic
The name "Economic" had been used by the associated businesses of GR Anderson and EW Wilson of Whitburn for their services between Sunderland and South Shields. These had been acquired by Tyne & Wear PTE on 1 January 1975. Prior to deregulation, TWPTE had painted an Atlantean in the old Economic colours of maroon and off-white (with black lining) to mark the 60th anniversary of the business, and as deregulation approached two of brand-new Leyland Olympians were delivered to the PTE in those colours, and with gold "ECONOMIC" fleetnames. At deregulation the Sunderland - South Shields routes 505 and 506 became Economic routes E1 and E2 (the E6 was introduced later), although Economic was in reality part of South Shields Busways.

Armstrong Galley
On 24 August 1973, Tyne & Wear PTE acquired two associated Newcastle-based businesses, R Armstrong (Bus Proprietor) Ltd. and Galley's Coaches Ltd., and immediately the "Armstrong Galley" name was adopted for the PTE's coaching and private hire division. Initially retaining the original PTE yellow and cream colours (of Newcastle Corporation), a new colour scheme of mid-blue with yellow, orange and red stripes was adopted around 1980. Armstrong Galley introduced a flagship service to London in the early 1980s, competing with National Express, and branded "Non-Stop Clipper". and used the striking 3 axle double deck coach, the MCW Metroliner. The Armstrong Galley operations continued unchanged with the creation of Busways in October 1986, but in the early 1990s it expanded into low-cost bus operation (using other divisions' cast-offs), culminating in an "Armstrong Galley Buses" operation being set up. These vehicles used a livery of mid-blue and white. After the Stagecoach takeover, the Armstrong Galley operations were closed down, with buses being transferred to Blue Bus Services.

Tyne & Wear Omnibus Company
Tyne & Wear Omnibus Company was an independent operator purchased by Go-Ahead Group, then immediately sold to Busways for £2m on 17 November 1989. Tyne & Wear Omnibus Company wore a livery of a white upper, dark blue lowers, with a green and maroon double stripe, and yellow fleet names. The identity was short-lived, and used only on minibuses. It disappeared in the withdrawal of these vehicles, with services transferred to Busways and Blue Bus.

Welcome Passenger Services
Welcome was an independent minibus based competitor in Newcastle using red and yellow vehicles. The company was bought by Busways in August 1993 and run as a subsidiary until the company was made dormant on 31 October.

References

External links

Bus Company purchasing records web site
Busways Atlantean 111 Restoration Group
Bristol Commercial Vehicle Enthusiasts -  Busways LH and RE fleet list
A website detailing Busways South Shields operations
bus service. Heritage website

Former bus operators in Tyne and Wear
Former PTE bus operators
Stagecoach Group
Transport companies established in 1986
Transport companies disestablished in 1995
1986 establishments in England
1995 disestablishments in England